Johann Anton Tischbein (28 August 1720, Haina - 26 July 1784, Hamburg) was a German painter and art teacher from the Tischbein family of artists.

Biography 
He was the fourth son of the baker, Johann Heinrich Tischbein (1682-1784), five of whose eight children became painters. After a short time at school, he worked as a carpenter in  Frankfurt. Later, he went to Paris to learn the art of wallpaper painting, which was very popular among the aristocracy at that time. When his studies were completed, he set up a studio in Frankfurt.

In 1749, he and his brother Johann Heinrich took a study trip to Italy. For many years thereafter, he created oil paintings based on the sketches and watercolors made during that trip.

In 1764, he moved to Hamburg, opened a private art school and was married in 1766. Five years later, he wrote a textbook on painting (Unterricht zu gründlicher Erlernung der Malerey) which, in 1780, earned him a place as an instructor at the Gelehrtenschule des Johanneums. He also painted several murals at Wandsbek Castle, which was demolished in 1861.

A street is named after him in Hamburg's Barmbek-Nord district.

References

External links 

Arcadja Auctions: More works by Tischbein.

1720 births
1784 deaths
18th-century German painters
18th-century German male artists
German male painters
German genre painters
People from Waldeck-Frankenberg
Decorative arts